Alsen may refer to:

Places
 Als Island, Denmark; called Alsen under Prussian/German administration (1864–1920)
 Alsen, North Dakota, US
 Alsen, South Dakota, US
 Alsen, Sweden, a parish and former municipality in Jämtland County, Sweden
 Alsen, a hamlet in Catskill, New York, US

People
Herbert Alsen (1906-1978), German operatic bass